Maximiliaeus odoceros is a species of decapod within the family Solenoceridae. It was discovered after being collected off Papua New Guinea in the Solomon Sea. The carapace of the species has bearing teeth along the entire dorsal border, along with three parallel carinae that run the entire length of the lateral carapace.

References 

Crustaceans described in 2012
Fauna of Papua New Guinea
Crustaceans of the Pacific Ocean
Solenoceridae